Wasscass (born 1977) is a German techno producer and label head born in Spaichingen, currently based in Stansstad Switzerland .

History
Growing up in a music-oriented family, Wasscass' life was filled with sounds of Kiss, Iron Maiden, Def Leppard or Judas Priest at a very early age already.
He became familiar with the world of EBM and Techno with records from Tommi Stumpff, Nitzer Ebb, Front Line Assembly and cubic22 from Berlin.

Buying his first turntables in 1992, he started his DJ career with his first gig as "al cutter" at club Cinderella in Tübingen in 1993.
He started the set with a 15-minute intro, followed by a solid gabba and hardcore set. Although this might have been the starting point, he was still missing a direction.
During those days, DJ Sven Väth fascinated all revelers with ingenious hardfloor from Frankfurt. Wasscass' encounter with Väth at Southern Germany's number 1 club "Oz" gave him the greencard for 1994's Futuresonic Party in Stuttgart, playing a set with four decks with flying colours.

Taking a break from DJing in 2001, he came back even bigger in 2007. Mainly being booked for industrial high-class rooftop parties always far from the mainstream, he also played all kinds of styles in clubs and radio stations, finding its peak at the Kazantip festival.
Nowadays, he only returns to the decks for the virtual community, despite not being the biggest supporter of social media.

In 1999 he opened his own club, "Alte Stilfabrik" (Nox Club), closing in 2002 due to conceptual deviations.

Wasscass started producing own tracks in 1996, never sticking to a certain style or genre.
Since then, he is producing several projects of different kinds of styles, with slaxory being the first sub-project evolving from the idea of a T-shirt label in 2008.
All of his projects have one thing in common - representing underground, aiming to establish a new genre, far from the norm. The latest release "Airport" is the best example.

He never reached for the limelight, avoiding commercial publicity wherever possible.

Discography
Album
 Digital Album: Cinnamon Moon (2020)
 Audio CD: Wait Until Darkness Comes (2019)
 Digital Album: Wait Until Darkness Comes (2019)
 Audio CD: The Orb (2019)
 Digital Album: The Orb (2019)
 Audio CD: Made in Switzerland (2019)
 Digital Album: Made in Switzerland (2019)
 Audio CD: September Sun (2017)
 Digital Album: September Sun (2017)
 Digital Album: Dust (2017)
 Digital Album: Energie (2017)
 Audio CD: Orbit (project Rhythmusschnalle, 2016)
 Audio CD: Airport (2016)

Vinyl
 White City / The Cat (2014; 12", S/Sided)
 Stand Up (2013; 12", W/Lbl, S/Sided, Ltd)

EP
 Fatman (2020)
 Florida (2017)
 Traumform (2016)

Mix Compilations
 Vision of the Future (2016)
 Blue Queen (2012)
 Dresscode No. 7 (2011)
 Green Queen (2010)
 White Queen (2010)

Digital Releases

slaxory - Digital Releases

al cutter - Digital Releases

Mr. Mo - Digital Releases

Lotta - Digital Releases

Gravenberg - Digital Releases
The Jockey (2014)

Station to Station - Digital Releases

Nuclear Tango - Digital Releases
Minitransform (2017)
Titanfall (2016)
NT Screening (2016)
Crime (2015)
Home Office (2015)

Rhythmusschnalle - Digital Releases
Kingsize (2017)
Mars (from the album "Orbit") (2016)
Jupiter (from the album "Orbit") (2016)
Venus (from the album "Orbit") (2016)
Saturn (from the album "Orbit") (2016)
Pluto (from the album "Orbit") (2016)
Merkur (from the album "Orbit") (2016)

References
 First Class - Top rated tracks - the Kings of Spins (Radio)
 "Seasons End" (EP "Stand Up") at Ibiza's Club Amnesia
 house-mixes.com
 The Field Remixes: Openfield
 Beatport Charts: Possessed
 Review "Airport" at Amazon.de
 Kazantip 2008
 5-year anniversary Electronic Player Records
 wasscass - Audio CD

External links
 
 Klangklar Records
 Rhythmusschnalle
 Wasscass on Discogs
 Wasscass on Soundcloud
 Bandcamp

German record producers
1977 births
Living people
Remixers